Valerio Aspromonte (born 16 March 1987) is an Italian right-handed foil fencer, three-time team European champion, 2013 team world champion, and 2012 team Olympic champion.

Medal Record

Olympic Games

World Championship

European Championship

Grand Prix

World Cup

References

External links
 
 

Fencers from Rome
Italian male foil fencers
Italian male fencers
1987 births
Living people
Olympic fencers of Italy
Fencers at the 2012 Summer Olympics
Olympic gold medalists for Italy
Olympic medalists in fencing
Medalists at the 2012 Summer Olympics
Mediterranean Games bronze medalists for Italy
Mediterranean Games medalists in fencing
Competitors at the 2013 Mediterranean Games
Fencers of Fiamme Gialle